The Rivière de Fer à Cheval is a river of Haiti. It is the primary tributary of the Artibonite River. This means that excess flow of water into the river can indirectly cause pressure on the Péligre Dam. This is notably the case in the aftermath of large-scale storms and hurricanes that hit Haiti.

See also
List of rivers of Haiti

References

Additional sources

GEOnet Names Server

Rivers of Haiti